Reena Kapoor is an Indian film and TV actress, who is best known for her role as Rani and Pari in Rajshri Production's Popular television show Woh Rehne Waali Mehlon Ki which completed 1387 episodes on Sahara One., Nimrit in Shakti - Astitva Ke Ehsaas Ki and Ranju in Ranju Ki Betiyaan. She has also done important roles in devotional serials Vishnu Puran, Jai Ganga Maiya, Jai Mahalakshmi, RadhaKrishn and many more.

Filmography

Films

 1998 Hero Hindustani as Aasma (Small role)
 2000 Kya Kehna as Anju (Supporting role)
 2002 Duplicate Sholay as Ram Kotori
 2007 Om Shanti Om as a Participant (appearance in Shanti auditions scene)

Television

References

21st-century Indian actresses
Year of birth missing (living people)
Living people
Indian television actresses